Professor Kamal Karunanayake (29 May 1937 - 18 November 2006) was a former MP, who represented the People's Alliance as a National List member from 1989 to 1994.

After Karunanayake was educated at Nalanda College Colombo and obtained a BA (Hons) degree in Economics from the Peradeniya University in 1962. He received a doctorate from the Birmingham University in England in 1969. In 2002 he retired as the Professor of Economics and the Director of the Centre for Development Studies at the University of Kelaniya.

Since November 2006, he served as the Senior Presidential Advisor in Economics contributing to the formulation of the Mahinda Chintana policy.

References

Members of the 9th Parliament of Sri Lanka
Sinhalese academics
Sri Lankan Buddhists
Alumni of Nalanda College, Colombo
1937 births
2006 deaths
Sri Lankan economists